Enrique Flamini also known as Enrico Flamini (17 April 1917 – 11 January 1982) was an Argentine-Italian footballer and manager.

1917 births
1982 deaths
Argentine footballers
Italian footballers
Argentine Primera División players
Serie A players
Uruguayan Primera División players
Racing Club de Avellaneda footballers
Talleres de Remedios de Escalada footballers
S.S. Lazio players
Peñarol players
A.C. Reggiana 1919 players
S.S. Lazio managers
Argentine expatriate footballers
Expatriate footballers in Uruguay
Argentine expatriate sportspeople in Uruguay
Italian expatriate sportspeople in Uruguay
Expatriate footballers in Brazil
Argentine expatriate sportspeople in Brazil
Italian expatriate sportspeople in Brazil
Association football forwards
Sportspeople from Rosario, Santa Fe